Guiseley railway station is a railway station in Guiseley, in the City of Leeds metropolitan borough, West Yorkshire, England.  On the Wharfedale Line between Ilkley and Leeds/Bradford Forster Square, it is served mostly by Class 333 electric trains run by Northern Trains, which also manages the station.

History

The station opened in 1865 originally being owned by the Midland Railway.  There were services to Otley until 1965 when the Arthington to Menston line closed under the Beeching axe. The line was electrified between 1994 and 1995 while the station was largely reconstructed in 2002.  Patronage has slowly increased at the station with it having consistently over one million annual passengers since 2012.

Services

During Monday to Saturday daytimes services run to/from Leeds and Bradford twice per hour, meaning that as Guiseley is the first station that is served by trains on both branches of the line, there are four services every hour to Ilkley.  During Monday to Saturday evenings, services are hourly to/from both Leeds and Bradford Forster Square.  On Sundays, services are hourly to/from Leeds and Bradford.  Services at the station are operated by British Rail Class 333 and Class 331 electric multiple units.

Facilities
The station facilities were redeveloped in 2002 to give a new waiting room on platform two (for trains to Leeds and Bradford) and a waiting room and ticket office on platform one (for trains to Ilkley).  This office is open from 06:15–19:30 Mon–Sat and 09:15–16:30 on Sundays.  A small car park is accessible from Station Road and the station has cycle lockers situated on either platform with an additional cycle shelter outside the ticket office.  Passengers on foot can also access the station via a path from Netherfield Road or a path that connects with Morton Terrace and Otley Road.  Step-free access is available only on the Ilkley-bound platform.  The station is equipped with live information displays, there is a payphone on platform one and an automated ticket machine which can be used outside of the ticket office hours on platform two.

Connections to Leeds Bradford Airport
Along with Horsforth station on the Harrogate Line, Guiseley is one of the two closest railway stations to Leeds Bradford Airport, at nearby Yeadon. An hourly bus service (Service A3) between the airport and Bradford Interchange runs along nearby Oxford Road. A more frequent bus service to/from the airport (Service A1) runs from Leeds railway station but takes longer.

References

External links

Railway stations in Leeds
Former Midland Railway stations
Railway stations in Great Britain opened in 1865
Northern franchise railway stations
DfT Category D stations 
DfT Category F1 stations 
Guiseley